"I'll Be Loving You (Forever)" is a 1989 ballad song from New Kids on the Block, released as the third single from the group's second album, Hangin' Tough. The lead vocals were sung by Jordan Knight. It was the group's first single to reach number one on the Billboard Hot 100, while peaking at number five in the UK.

"I'll Be Loving You (Forever)" rose from #56 to #41 the week of April 15, 1989 as "You Got It (The Right Stuff)" was descending from the Top 40.  The single proved to be a popular single in the early summer of 1989, reaching #1 on June 17, 1989.  The ballad boasted 6 weeks in the Top 10, 8 weeks in the Top 20, and 14 weeks in the Top 40.

Music video
Most of the music video for "I'll Be Loving You (Forever)" was shot in Xavier High School in New York City. Small parts were filmed on the Williamsburg Bridge and the East River.

Track listing
Maxi-CD
"I'll Be Loving You (Forever)" (7" Version) - 3:54
"I'll Be Loving You (Forever)" (12" Version) - 5:25
"I'll Be Loving You (Forever)" (More 7" Remix Style) - 3:41
"I Wanna Be Loved By You" - 4:56

Official remixes and versions
"I'll Be Loving You (Forever)" [Album Version] - 4:27
"I'll Be Loving You (Forever)" [Instrumental] - 4:12
"I'll Be Loving You (Forever)" [Video Version] 4:21
"I'll Be Loving You (Forever)" [More 7" Remix Style] - 3:35
"I'll Be Loving You (Forever)" [More 7" Remix Version] - 3:41
"I'll Be Loving You (Forever)" [12" Version] - 5:20

Charts and certifications

Weekly charts

Year-end charts

Certifications

Notes

External links
 Joey McIntyre discusses "I'll Be Loving You (Forever)" - RetroRewind interview
Official video

1988 songs
1989 singles
New Kids on the Block songs
Columbia Records singles
Billboard Hot 100 number-one singles
Songs written by Maurice Starr
Song recordings produced by Maurice Starr
Pop ballads